Abu Muhammad Ubaydallah ibn Ahmad ibn Ma'ruf was thrice chief  in Iraq under the Buyid dynasty.

Life
A Mu'tazilite, Ibn Ma'ruf was a prominent member of the cultural circle around the vizier Abu Muhammad al-Hasan al-Muhallabi (950/1–963).

Ibn Ma'ruf was appointed chief  of Iraq in June 971 and held the office until he resigned in 973/4 in protest at the interference of the Buyid emirs in the administration of justice. His successor, Muhammad ibn Salih al-Hashimi, was deposed in May/June 975, and Ibn Ma'ruf was restored to the office of chief . Caliph al-Ta'i offered Ibn Ma'ruf the position of caliphal secretary, but Ibn Ma'ruf refused.

He was dismissed and exiled to Fars by the Buyid ruler Adud al-Dawla on 23 August 979, along with other members of the Baghdad establishment close to the caliph. The position of chief  in Baghdad was abolished altogether, and the judicial administration of Iraq handed over to the chief  of Shiraz. Iraq was thus effectively reduced to a regular province of the Buyid empire, governed from a new imperial centre. 

Although Ibn Ma'ruf was released from captivity by Adud al-Dawla's successor, Sharaf al-Dawla, in 983, no chief  was appointed in Baghdad until Ibn Ma'ruf's return in 987, when he resumed his position and held it until his death on 25 April 991.

References

Sources
 

10th-century births
10th century in Iraq
991 deaths
Chief qadis of the Abbasid Caliphate
Buyid officials
Mu'tazilites
Prisoners and detainees of the Buyid dynasty